BFQ or bfq may refer to:

Transportation
 Bahia Piña, (IATA code) an airport in Panama
 Bendi railway station (station code), in the Railway stations in Jharkhand
 BFQ, engine code for one of the Volkswagen EA827 engine family

Other uses
 Badaga language (ISO 639-3 code: bfq)
 Bite force quotient, of animals
 Budget Fair Queueing, a Linux I/O scheduler